Transformers vs. The Terminator is an American comic book limited series published on 2020 by IDW Publishing and Dark Horse Comics. It is a crossover event between the Transformers franchise, owned by Hasbro, and the Terminator franchise, currently owned by StudioCanal.

Premise 
In the year 2029, the Earth has been laid to waste, ravaged by the Decepticons after their complete victory over the Autobots. To prevent this from occurring and ensure their own dominance, Skynet sends a lone T-800 unit back in time to 1984 to destroy the dormant Cybertronians and save the future.

Publication history 
Transformers vs. The Terminator is produced by IDW Publishing in partnership with Dark Horse Comics, current license holder of the Terminator franchise.

Co-writer and IDW's Editor-in-Chief John Barber said “I still remember the visceral thrill and terror of my first viewing of The Terminator, and while I’ve seen it a hundred times since then, it still gets my pulse running. I’ve worked on Transformers a lot over the years, and the opportunity to combine these two mechanistic universes together to see who comes out on top (while working alongside Tom, David, and my old collaborator Alex, no less) —well, it’s way too exciting a chance to pass up.”

Artist Alex Milne said “Transformers was a large part of my childhood; I was captivated, wanting to see how Optimus Prime would foil the plans of Megatron. Later, I came across The Terminator and was amazed by the idea of a robot pretending to be a human, sent back in time to hunt down a specific target. Now, as an adult, I’m very pleased to lend my talents to a project which sees these sci-fi icons brought together!”

Characters

Issues

Reception

Collected editions

References

External links 
 IDW Publishing's official announcement

2020 comics debuts
2020 comics endings
Transformers comics
Terminator (franchise) comics
Intercompany crossovers